Matej Ižvolt (born 5 June 1986) is a Slovak footballer.

Club career
He started his football career in ZTS Dubnica, in June 2007 he signed a 3-year contract with ŠK Slovan Bratislava. He represented Slovakia in the Under-21 categories. In July 2012, he joined Polish club Piast Gliwice on a one-year contract.

References

External links
MFK Dubnica profile 

1986 births
Living people
Slovak footballers
Slovakia under-21 international footballers
Slovak expatriate footballers
Association football midfielders
FK Dubnica players
ŠK Slovan Bratislava players
1. FC Tatran Prešov players
Slovak Super Liga players
Piast Gliwice players
Ekstraklasa players
Expatriate footballers in Poland
People from Ilava
Sportspeople from the Trenčín Region